Latvia has participated in the Eurovision Young Dancers 5 times since its debut in 1997.

Participation overview

See also
Latvia in the Eurovision Song Contest
Latvia in the Eurovision Young Musicians

External links 
 Eurovision Young Dancers

Countries in the Eurovision Young Dancers